Arielle Caroline Kebbel (born February 19, 1985) is an American actress and model. She has appeared in various television series, including Gilmore Girls (2003–2004), The Vampire Diaries (2009–2017), Life Unexpected (2010), 90210 (2011–2013), Ballers (2015–2016, 2019), Midnight Texas (2017–2018), and Lincoln Rhyme: Hunt for the Bone Collector (2019–2020). Kebbel has also appeared in films such as American Pie Presents: Band Camp (2005), John Tucker Must Die (2006), The Grudge 2 (2006), Forever Strong (2008), The Uninvited (2009), Think Like a Man (2012), Fifty Shades Freed (2018) and After Ever Happy (2022).

Early life and modeling career
Kebbel was born on February 19, 1985, in Winter Park, Florida. She is mostly of German and Swiss German descent. Her mother, Sheri, is a talent manager and owns a production company. Kebbel graduated from Crenshaw School in Winter Garden. She was the first runner-up at the 2002 Miss Florida Teen USA beauty pageant. Before pursuing a career in acting, Kebbel was a full-time model. She was trained at the Lisa Maile Image, Modeling & Acting School in Florida. She has since appeared in numerous magazines such as Maxim, H, Lucky, Men's Health, Stuff, FHM.Vegas, Bello and Razor.

Acting career

Within the first week of moving to Los Angeles, California, Kebbel successfully auditioned for her first major role portraying Lindsay Lister on The CW's Gilmore Girls. She went on to become a recurring role throughout the third, fourth, and fifth seasons. She worked in television programming such as Entourage, Grounded for Life, Law & Order: Special Victims Unit, and The Vampire Diaries. She worked in two pilots, Football Wives and No Heroics for ABC.

In 2004, Kebbel worked with Kevin Hart, Tom Arnold, and Snoop Dogg in the hip-hop comedy Soul Plane. She worked in films such as Be Cool, The Kid & I, American Pie Presents: Band Camp, and Reeker. Kebbel played the role of Carrie Schaeffer in 20th Century Fox's romantic comedy film John Tucker Must Die (2006). It was released in North America on July 28, 2006, earning US$68 million worldwide. Kebbel signed on for another 20th Century Fox film titled Aquamarine (2006) starring Sara Paxton, Emma Roberts, and JoJo. Kebbel portrayed the role of the film's villain, Cecilia Banks. The film was released in March 2006 with moderate success, earning US$23 million worldwide.

In 2006, Kebbel starred alongside Sarah Michelle Gellar and Teresa Palmer in The Grudge 2. The film is a sequel to the 2004 horror film, The Grudge, a re-make of the Japanese original. Kebbel described her role of schoolgirl Allison Flemming as "The girl you see in the background of all the pictures that wants to be a part of everything but never is". Filming took place in Tokyo, Japan, in April that same year. The film was released on October 13, 2006 and was a box office success, grossing over $70 million worldwide.

She portrayed Emily Owens in the sports drama film Forever Strong (2008) alongside Penn Badgley, Sean Faris, and Neal McDonough. Filming took place in August 2006 in Salt Lake City. This is Badgley and Kebbel's second film together after John Tucker Must Die. The film was released straight-to-DVD on September 26, 2008.

In February 2008, Kebbel was announced to star as the central character Katherine in the horror film Freakdog alongside Sarah Carter. The film received a limited theatrical release on August 22, 2008, and was quickly released to DVD in February 2009. Reception was universally negative.

In March 2008, Paramount Pictures announced Kebbel was portraying the role of Alex Ivers in the American remake of the 2003 South Korean Horror film A Tale of Two Sisters. Emily Browning and Elizabeth Banks were confirmed to be co-starring. Filming took place in late 2008 in Vancouver, British Columbia. Despite performances of the cast, reception was 'mixed-to-negative'. The film earned US$40 million worldwide. Kebbel also starred in the comedy The Brooklyn Brothers Beat the Best, premiering on September 9, 2011, at the 2011 Toronto International Film Festival. The film, widely release in 2012, is the directorial debut for writer/director/star Ryan O'Nan, and features Michael Weston, Andrew McCarthy, and Jason Ritter.

In December 2011, Kebbel worked in season four of 90210 portraying Vanessa. In October 2012, Kebbel appeared on Hawaii Five-0, in the season three episode "Popilikia".

She will be recurring on 9-1-1 as firefighter Lucy Donato from the rival Firehouse 147.

Personal life 
Kebbel is good friends with actress Torrey DeVitto, who was also raised in Winter Park, Florida.

Filmography

Film

Television

Music videos

References

External links
 

1985 births
21st-century American actresses
Actresses from Florida
American beauty pageant contestants
American beauty pageant winners
American film actresses
American game show hosts
American people of German descent
American television actresses
Female models from Florida
Living people
People from Winter Park, Florida